The 2009 SAT Khorat Open was a professional tennis tournament played on outdoor hard courts. It was part of the 2009 ATP Challenger Tour. It took place in Khorat, Thailand between 23 and 29 March 2009.

Single entrants

Seeds

Rankings are as of March 16, 2009.

Other entrants
The following players received wildcards into the singles main draw:
  Grigor Dimitrov
  Sonchat Ratiwatana
  Peerakiat Siriluethaiwattana
  Kittipong Wachiramanowong

The following players received entry from the qualifying draw:
  Chen Ti
  Evgeny Donskoy
  Denys Molchanov
  Filip Prpic

The following player received Special exempt into the main draw:
  Noam Okun

Champions

Men's singles

 Andreas Beck def.  Filip Prpic, 7–5, 6–3

Men's doubles

 Rohan Bopanna /  Aisam-ul-Haq Qureshi def.  Sanchai Ratiwatana /  Sonchat Ratiwatana, 6–3, 6–7(5), [10–5]

External links
ITF search 
2009 Draws

 
 ATP Challenger Tour
Tennis, ATP Challenger Tour, SAT Khorat Open
Tennis, ATP Challenger Tour, SAT Khorat Open

Tennis, ATP Challenger Tour, SAT Khorat Open